Emilius may refer to:

People 
 Saint Emilius (died 250), Christian martyr
 Emilius Ditlev Bærentzen (1799–1868), Danish painter
 Emilius Bangert (1883–1962), Danish composer, organist, and academic
 Emilius Bayley (1823–1917), English clergyman and cricketer
 Emilius R. Ciampa (1896–1996), American artist
 Émilius Goulet (born 1933), Canadian Roman Catholic archbishop
 Emilius Hopkinson (1869–1951), British aviculturist
 Emilius Seghers (1855–1927), bishop of Ghent
 Emilius Wagemans (1926–2011), Belgian singer

Other uses 
 Emilius (horse), a racehorse
 Monte Emilius, a mountain in the Graian Alps

See also 
 Emil (given name)